Derrick Ashihundu (born 1 January 1998) is a Kenyan rugby union player, currently playing for the  in the 2022 Currie Cup First Division. His preferred position is wing.

Professional career
Ashihundu was named in the  squad for the 2022 Currie Cup First Division.< Ashihundu is a Kenyan international in rugby sevens.

References

External links
itsrugby.co.uk Profile

1998 births
Living people
Rugby union wings
Kenyan rugby union players
Simbas players